The following is a list of all-time records and statistics competed by Ottawa Football Clubs in the Canadian Football League and the preceding Interprovincial Rugby Football Union. As defined in the 2016 CFL's Facts, Figures, and Records, for historical record purposes and by the current Ottawa Redblacks' request, the Ottawa Football Clubs are considered to be a single entity since 1876 with two periods of inactivity (1997–2001 and 2006–2013). Consequently, this list includes figures from the Ottawa Football Club (1876–1898), Ottawa Rough Riders (1899–1925, 1931–1996), Ottawa Senators (1926–1930), Ottawa Renegades (2002–2005), and Ottawa Redblacks (2014–present). 

These figures are current to the 2022 CFL season and are for regular season games only. Each category lists the top five players, where known, except for when the fifth place player is tied in which case all players with the same number are listed.

Games played 

Most Games Played
201 – Moe Racine (1958–74)
186 – Gerry Organ (1971–77, 79–83)
169 – Bob Simpson (1950–62)
167 – Ron Stewart (1958–70)
166 – Russ Jackson (1958–69)

Most Seasons Played
22 – Eddie Emerson (1912–15, 19–35, 37)
17 – Moe Racine (1958–74)
13 – Joe Tubman (1919–31)
13 – Bob Simpson (1950–62)
13 – Ron Stewart (1958–70)

Scoring 

Most Points – Career
1462 – Gerry Organ (1971–77, 79–83)
841 – Dean Dorsey (1984–87, 89–90)
772 – Terry Baker (1990–95)
591 – Lewis Ward (2018–19, 2021–22)
402 – Ron Stewart (1958–70)

Most Points – Season
202 – Terry Baker – 1991
198 – Lawrence Tynes – 2003
184 – Terry Baker – 1992
178 – Terry Baker – 1994
178 – Christopher Milo – 2016

Most Points – Game
24 – Dave Thelen – versus Toronto Argonauts, September 16, 1959
24 – Ron Stewart – at Montreal Alouettes, October 10, 1960
24 – Art Green – versus Hamilton Tiger-Cats, September 7, 1975
24 – Dean Dorsey – versus Saskatchewan Roughriders, September 24, 1989

Most Touchdowns – Career
70 – Bob Simpson (1950–62)
67 – Ron Stewart (1958–70)
59 – Tony Gabriel (1975–81)
55 – Russ Jackson (1958–69)
54 – Whit Tucker (1962–70)

Most Touchdowns – Season
18 – Alvin Walker – 1982
16 – Ron Stewart – 1960
16 – Caleb Evans – 2022
15 – Art Green – 1976
14 – Vic Washington – 1969
14 – Art Green – 1975
14 – Tony Gabriel – 1976

Most Touchdowns – Game
4 – Ken Charlton – versus Hamilton Tigers, November 9, 1946
4 – Dave Thelen – versus Toronto Argonauts, September 16, 1959
4 – Ron Stewart – at Montreal Alouettes, October 10, 1960
4 – Art Green – versus Hamilton Tiger-Cats, September 7, 1975

Most Receiving Touchdowns – Career
65 – Bob Simpson (1950–62)
61 – Tony Gabriel (1975–81)
54 – Whit Tucker (1962–70)
34 – Stephen Jones (1990–94)
33 – Hugh Oldham (1970–74)

Most Receiving Touchdowns – Season
14 – Tony Gabriel – 1976
13 – Whit Tucker – 1968
13 – Hugh Oldham – 1970
12 – David Williams – 1990 
12 – Greg Ellingson – 2017

Most Receiving Touchdowns – Game
3 – Many, most recently Chris Williams – versus Calgary Stampeders, July 8, 2016

Most Rushing Touchdowns – Career
54 – Russ Jackson (1958–69)
43 – Ron Stewart (1958–70)
39 – Dave Thelen (1958–64)
32 – Art Green (1973–76, 78) 
24 – Alvin Walker (1982–84) 

Most Rushing Touchdowns – Season
16 – Caleb Evans – 2022
15 – Ron Stewart – 1960
13 – Art Green – 1976
13 – Alvin Walker – 1982
11 – Art Green – 1975

Most Rushing Touchdowns – Game
4 – Dave Thelen – versus Toronto Argonauts, September 16, 1959
4 – Ron Stewart – versus Montreal Alouettes, October 10, 1960
4 – Art Green – versus Hamilton Tiger-Cats, September 7, 1975
3 – Many, most recently Dominique Davis – at Calgary Stampeders, June 15, 2019

Passing 

Most Passing Yards – Career
24,593 – Russ Jackson (1958–69)
13,096 – Trevor Harris (2016–18)
11,840 – Henry Burris (2014–16)
11,251 – Damon Allen (1989–91)
10,937 – J. C. Watts (1981–86)

Most Passing Yards – Season
5693 – Henry Burris – 2015
5116 – Trevor Harris – 2018
5063 – Tom Burgess – 1993
4679 – Trevor Harris – 2017
4466 – Kerry Joseph - 2005

Most Passing Yards – Game
504 – Henry Burris – versus Montreal Alouettes, October 1, 2015
487 – Trevor Harris – versus Montreal Alouettes, August 11, 2018
485 – Trevor Harris – versus BC Lions, October 1, 2016
477 – Henry Burris – versus Saskatchewan Roughriders, September 19, 2015
471 – Chris Isaac – versus Montreal Concordes, July 29, 1982

Most Pass Completions – Career
1,356 – Russ Jackson (1958–69)
1,071 – Trevor Harris (2016–18)
976 – Henry Burris (2014–16)
803 – Kerry Joseph (2003–05)
767 – Damon Allen (1989–91)

Most Pass Completions – Season
481 – Henry Burris – 2015
431 – Trevor Harris – 2018
398 – Trevor Harris – 2017
337 – Kerry Joseph – 2005
329 – Tom Burgess – 1993

Most Pass Completions – Game
45 – Henry Burris – versus Montreal Alouettes, October 1, 2015
44 – Trevor Harris – versus Montreal Alouettes, August 11, 2018
39 – Trevor Harris – versus Calgary Stampeders, July 8, 2016
36 – Trevor Harris – versus Hamilton Tiger-Cats, August 18, 2017
35 – Henry Burris – versus Saskatchewan Roughriders, September 19, 2015

Most Passing Touchdowns – Career
185 – Russ Jackson (1958–69)
75 – Damon Allen (1989–91)
68 – Trevor Harris (2016–18)
66 – Tom Clements (1975–78)
64 – Tom Burgess (1986, 1992–93)

Most Passing Touchdowns – Season
34 – Damon Allen – 1990
33 – Russ Jackson – 1969
30 – Tom Burgess – 1993
30 – Trevor Harris – 2017
29 – Tom Burgess – 1992

Most Passing Touchdowns – Game
6 – Henry Burris – versus Hamilton Tiger-Cats, November 7, 2015
5 – Chris Isaac – versus Montreal Concordes, July 29, 1982
5 – Damon Allen – versus Edmonton Eskimos, July 26, 1990
5 – Tom Burgess – versus Toronto Argonauts, July 9, 1992

Rushing 

Most Rushing Yards – Career
6,917 – Dave Thelen (1958–64)
5,689 – Ron Stewart (1958–70)
5,045 – Russ Jackson (1958–69)
4,028 – Josh Ranek (2002–05)
4,001 – Reggie Barnes (1990–93, 96)

Most Rushing Yards – Season
1486 – Reggie Barnes – 1991
1431 – Alvin Walker – 1983
1407 – Dave Thelen – 1960
1362 – William Powell – 2018
1339 – Dave Thelen – 1959

Most Rushing Yards – Game
287 – Ron Stewart – versus Montreal Alouettes, October 10, 1960
213 – Tim McCray – versus Edmonton Eskimos, September 21, 1984
209 – Dave Thelen – versus Toronto Argonauts, September 14, 1960
203 – Alvin Walker – versus Calgary Stampeders, October 23, 1982 

Most Rushing Attempts – Career
1,211 – Dave Thelen (1958–64)
983 – Ron Stewart (1958–70)
777 – Reggie Barnes (1990–93, 96)
745 – Art Green (1973–76, 78)
739 – Josh Ranek (2002–05)

Most Rushing Attempts – Season
291 – Reggie Barnes – 1991
258 – Art Green – 1975
251 – William Powell – 2018
245 – Dave Thelen – 1960
238 – Alvin Walker – 1983

Most Rushing Attempts – Game
33 – Dave Thelen – versus Toronto Argonauts, September 14, 1960
30 – Tim McCray – versus Edmonton Eskimos, September 21, 1984
27 – Alvin Walker – versus Calgary Stampeders, October 23, 1982 

Longest Rush
87 – Bo Scott – versus Montreal Alouettes, August 26, 1965
85 – Vic Washington – versus BC Lions, August 13, 1969
81 – Tim McCray – versus Edmonton Eskimos, September 21, 1984

Receiving 

Most Receiving Yards – Career
7,484 – Tony Gabriel (1975–81)
6,092 – Whit Tucker (1962–70)
6,034 – Bob Simpson (1950–62)
5,127 – Brad Sinopoli (2015–19)
5,108 – Stephen Jones (1990–94)

Most Receiving Yards – Season
1471 – Gerald Alphin – 1989
1459 – Greg Ellingson – 2017
1402 – Margene Adkins – 1969
1400 – Stephen Jones – 1992
1376 – Brad Sinopoli – 2018

Most Receiving Yards – Game
258 – Bob Simpson – versus Toronto Argonauts, September 29, 1956
254 – Stephen Jones – versus Toronto Argonauts, July 9, 1992
231 – Margene Adkins – versus Toronto Argonauts, October 15, 1969

Most Receptions – Career
455 – Brad Sinopoli (2015–19)
444 – Tony Gabriel (1975–81)
332 – Greg Ellingson (2015–18)
278 – Stephen Jones (1990–94)
274 – Bob Simpson (1950–62)

Most Receptions – Season
116 – Brad Sinopoli – 2018
96 – Greg Ellingson – 2017
94 – Marc Lewis – 1987
91 – Brad Sinopoli – 2017
91 – Greg Ellingson – 2018

Most Receptions – Game
13 – Marc Barousse – versus Hamilton Tiger-Cats, July 3, 1986
12 – Mossis Madu – versus Toronto Argonauts, September 7, 2019
11 – Tony Gabriel – versus Montreal Alouettes, August 16, 1976
11 – Robert Gordon – versus BC Lions, November 2, 1996
11 – Josh Ranek – versus Winnipeg Blue Bombers August 19, 2005
11 – Brad Sinopoli – versus Montreal Alouettes, July 6, 2018
11 – Brad Sinopoli – versus BC Lions, July 20, 2018
11 – Greg Ellingson – versus Montreal Alouettes, August 11, 2018
11 – Dominique Rhymes – versus Saskatchewan Roughriders, June 20, 2019
11 – Justin Hardy – versus Montreal Alouettes, October 10, 2022

Interceptions 

Most Interceptions – Career
46 – Joe Poirier (1959–70)
37 – Al Marcelin (1970–75)
32 – Jerry Campbell (1968–75)
31 – Rod Woodward (1971–76)

Most Interceptions – Season
11 – Less Browne – 1992
10 – Don Sutherin – 1969
10 – Mike Nelms – 1979
10 – Troy Wilson – 1988
10 – Korey Banks – 2005

Most Interceptions – Game
4 – Chris Sigler – versus Montreal Alouettes, June 27, 1986

Most Interception Return Yards – Career
658 – Joe Poirier (1959–70)
543 – Rod Woodward (1971–76)

Most Interception Return Yards – Season
259 – Less Browne – 1992
236 – Barry Ardern – 1969

Most Interception Return Yards – Game
172 – Barry Ardern – versus Hamilton Tiger-Cats, November 1, 1969

Tackles 
 Note: Tackles were first recorded in 1987, but there was no differentiation between Defensive and Special Teams tackles. Those categorical differences were added in 1991.

Most Total Tackles – Season
127 – Bruce Holmes – 1990
95 – Kyries Hebert – 2005
94 – Taylor Reed – 2017
94 – Avery Williams – 2022

Most Defensive Tackles – Season
127 – Bruce Holmes – 1990
94 – Taylor Reed – 2017
92 – Avery Williams – 2022
89 – Avery Williams – 2021
86 – Kelly Wiltshire – 2002

Most Defensive Tackles – Game
14 – Bruce Holmes – versus Edmonton Eskimos, October 15, 1989
14 – Avery Williams – versus Edmonton Elks, August 7, 2021

Most Special Team Tackles – Career
99 – Nigel Romick (2014–19, 2021–22)
74 – Antoine Pruneau (2014–19, 2021–22)
60 – Kyries Hebert (2004–05, 2018)
56 – Andrew Marshall (2014–18)
53 – Jean-Philippe Bolduc (2016–2019)

Most Special Team Tackles – Season
30 – Dean Noel – 1994
29 – Kyries Hebert – 2005
29 – Keelan Johnson – 2017
27 – Daniel Hunter – 1991
27 – Kyries Hebert – 2004

Most Special Team Tackles – Game
7 – Darren Joseph – versus Toronto Argonauts, October 13, 2003
6 – Daniel Hunter – versus Calgary Stampeders, July 24, 1991

Quarterback sacks (since 1981) 

Most Sacks – Career
71 – Greg Marshall (1981–87)
57 – Loyd Lewis (1985–91, 95–96)
41 – Gregg Stumon (1990–93)
39 – Angelo Snipes (1991–93)
23 – Justin Capicciotti (2014–15)

Most Sacks – Season
20 – Angelo Snipes – 1992
17 – Lorenzo Mauldin – 2022
16.5 – Greg Marshall – 1984
15.5 – Greg Marshall – 1983
15 – Loyd Lewis – 1986

Most Sacks – Game
5 – Anthony Collier – versus BC Lions, July 8, 2005

Field goals 

Most Field Goals – Career
318 – Gerry Organ (1971–77, 79–83)
196 – Dean Dorsey (1984–87, 89–90)
173 – Lewis Ward (2018–19, 2021–22)
159 – Terry Baker (1990–95)
78 – Christopher Milo (2015–16) 

Most Field Goals – Season
51 – Lawrence Tynes – 2003
51 – Lewis Ward – 2018
49 – Lewis Ward – 2022
47 – Christopher Milo – 2016
46 – Terry Baker – 1991
46 – Terry Baker – 1994

Most Field Goals – Game
7 – Dean Dorsey – versus Saskatchewan Roughriders, September 24, 1989
7 – Terry Baker – versus Edmonton Eskimos, July 20, 1994
7 – Lewis Ward – versus Hamilton Tiger-Cats, July 28, 2018
7 – Lewis Ward – versus Edmonton Eskimos, September 22, 2018

Highest Field Goal Accuracy – Career (minimum 75 attempts)
88.72% (173/195) – Lewis Ward (2018–19, 2021–22)
84.78% (78/92) – Christopher Milo (2015–16)
81.61% (71/87) – Lawrence Tynes (2002–03)
75.97% (196/258) – Dean Dorsey (1984–87, 89–90)
75.86% (66/87) – Brett Maher (2014–15, 17)

Highest Field Goal Accuracy – Season (minimum 30 attempts)
98.08% (51/52) – Lewis Ward – 2018
91.18% (31/34) – Christopher Milo – 2015
86.00% (43/50) – Lewis Ward – 2019
85.96% (49/57) – Lewis Ward – 2022
84.85% (28/33) – Gerry Organ – 1982

Longest Field Goal
56 – Lewis Ward – versus Hamilton Tiger-Cats, October 19, 2019
55 – Dean Dorsey – versus Saskatchewan Roughriders, July 7, 1985
55 – Wayne Lammie – versus Calgary Stampeders, September 27, 1996
55 – Christopher Milo – versus Edmonton Eskimos, June 25, 2016
55 – Christopher Milo – versus Toronto Argonauts, July 31, 2016

Most Consecutive Field Goals
69 – Lewis Ward (June 28, 2018 – August 9, 2019)
23 – Dean Dorsey (November 1, 1986 – August 9, 1987)

References 

Total football stats Ottawa Rough Riders
Ottawa Rough Riders Records
Ottawa Redblacks Media Guide 2017
CFL Record Book 2017
CFL website

Ottawa Rough Riders
Ottawa Renegades
Ottawa Redblacks lists
Canadian Football League records and statistics